No 36 Squadron of the Royal Flying Corps (later the Royal Air Force) was formed at Cramlington in 1916 and was disbanded for the last time in 1975.

History

First World War

No 36 Squadron Royal Flying Corps was first formed on 18 March 1916 at Cramlington, Northumberland as a Home Defence squadron, defending the coastline between Newcastle upon Tyne and Whitby against German Zeppelin attacks. On 27 November 1916, Second Lieutenant Ian Vernon Pyott, flying a Royal Aircraft Factory B.E.2c destroyed Zeppelin L.34 over Hartlepool, for which he was awarded the Distinguished Service Order. Once Zeppelin attacks on the North of England stopped, the Squadron switched to training duties, becoming part of the Royal Air Force on 1 April 1918, disbanding on 13 June 1919.

Torpedo bombers
On 1 October 1928, No 36 Squadron was reformed by redesignating the Coast Defence Torpedo Flight, based at Donibristle in Scotland and flying Hawker Horsleys. It was sent to Singapore to strengthen its defences against naval attack, with its aircraft reaching its destination on 17 December 1930. As well as practicing torpedo attacks and working with the Royal Navy, 36 Squadron was deployed to Rangoon in response to a rebellion in Burma, carrying out bombing raids against the insurgents. The squadron was re-equipped with Vickers Vildebeests in July 1935, continuing as a torpedo bomber squadron operating from Singapore. The squadron's badge, awarded in February 1938, reflected its role on torpedoes, showing an "eagle wings elevated perched on a torpedo".

Second World War
36 Squadron, along with No. 100 Squadron RAF retained the obsolete biplanes when Japan invaded Malaya, and flew an unsuccessful attack against the Japanese cruiser Sendai during the Battle of Kota Bharu on 8 December 1941. It continued operating against the Japanese, its Vildebeests being supplemented by five ex-Fleet Air Arm Fairey Albacores. Where possible it operated by night, bombing Japanese-held airfields and troops.

On 26 January 1942, Japanese forces landed at Endau, on the east coast of Malaya, 150 miles from Singapore. To oppose this landing, nine Vildebeests of No 100 Squadron and three of 36 Squadron, together with nine Australian Lockheed Hudsons, set off at 1:00 pm (having flown against land targets the night before), and despite a fighter escort five Vildebeests were shot down. No 36 and 100 Squadrons repeated the attack two hours later with nine Vildebeests (with two from 100 Squadron) and three Albacores. This time the fighter escort was late, only finding the bomber force once it had been engaged by Japanese Nakajima Ki-27 fighters, with a further five Vildebeests and two Albacores shot down, and a further two more damaged so badly that they were written off. These losses—which included the commanding officers of both Squadrons—could not be sustained, and the remnants of the two squadrons were evacuated to Java on 31 January, being merged into a single unit. On 28 February, nine Videbeests attacked a Japanese convoy off Rembang in Northern Java, claiming eight ships sunk but losing another commanding officer. It ceased to exist on 7 March 1942 after its last two Vildebeests ditched off Sumatra while attempting to evacuate to Ceylon.

No 36 Squadron reformed at Thanjavur in India on 22 October 1942, although it did not receive any aircraft until December that year when it was equipped with Vickers Wellington bombers for anti-submarine patrols off Madras. It flew its first convoy escort mission on 13 January 1943.

It moved to Algeria in June 1943. One tactic used against German U-boats in the Mediterranean was known as "Swamp", the area around a sighting would be saturated with aircraft, keeping the submarine submerged and stopping it from charging its batteries. On 12 December 1943, the destroyer  was torpedoed and sunk by the German submarine  while escorting the convoy KMS 34 off Algeria. In response, the area was saturated by ships and aircraft. During the hunt, U-593 sank another destroyer, before a Wellington of 36 Squadron detected the submarine on radar on the night of 12/13 December. A second 36 Squadron Wellington responded to the sighting report and attacked U-343, but was damaged by return fire from the submarine although it did manage to safely return to base. On the next night a third 36 Squadron aircraft found U-343 and directed two Wellingtons from 179 Squadron to attack, one of was shot down by the submarine, which after yet further attacks by a Catalina flying boat of 202 Squadron finally managed to escape and reach its base at Toulon. Another example of the "swamp" tactic took place on 14–17 May 1944, when Leigh Light equipped Wellingtons of 36 Squadron made several attacks on U-616, which culminated in it being sunk by US Navy destroyers, while on 18 May a Wellington of No 36 Squadron sighted and attacked U-960 before directing the destroyers USS Ludlow and Niblack, which sank the U-boat. It returned to RAF Chivenor in September 1944, continuing in the anti-submarine role. It disbanded at RAF Benbecula on 4 June 1945.

Post-war operations
On 1 October 1946, the squadron was reformed at Thorney Island by renumbering No. 248 Squadron, flying de Havilland Mosquitos, being disbanded again on 15 October 1947. The squadron was again reformed on 1 July 1953 as a maritime reconnaissance unit at RAF Topcliffe, flying Lockheed P-2 Neptunes until 28 February 1957. The following year, on 1 September, the squadron re-emerged at RAF Colerne as a transport squadron, flying the Handley Page Hastings previously operated by No. 511 Squadron RAF, and concentrating on tactical transport operations. In August 1967 the squadron relocated to RAF Lyneham and the Hastings were replaced by Lockheed C-130 Hercules. It was disbanded again on 3 November 1975.

Aircraft operated
Source – The Squadrons of the Royal Air Force unless stated

 Royal Aircraft Factory B.E.2
 Royal Aircraft Factory B.E.12
 Royal Aircraft Factory F.E.2b
 Armstrong Whitworth F.K.8
 Bristol Scout
 Avro 504K
 Sopwith Pup
 Bristol Fighter
 Hawker Horsley I: 1928–1930
 Hawker Horsley III: 1930–1935
 Vickers Vildebeest III: 1935–1942
 Fairey Albacore: 1941–1942
 Vickers Wellington Ic: 1942–1943
 Vickers Wellington VIII: 1943
 Vickers Wellington X: 1943
 Vickers Wellington XI: 1943
 Vickers Wellington XII: 1943
 Vickers Wellington XIII: 1943
 Vickers Wellington XIV: 1943–1945
 de Havilland Mosquito F.B.6: 1946–1947
 Lockheed P-2 Neptune: 1953–1957
 Handley Page Hastings: 1958–1967
 Lockheed C-130 Hercules: 1967–1975

See also
List of Royal Air Force aircraft squadrons

References

Notes

Bibliography

 Blair, Clay. Hitler's U-Boat War : The Hunted 1942–1945. New York:Modern Library, 2000. .
 Bruce, J.M. The Aeroplanes of the Royal Flying Corps (Military Wing). London:Putnam, 1982. .
 "D.S.O. for Zepp. Strafer". Flight, 21 December 1916. p. 1112.
 Halley, James J. The Squadrons of the Royal Air Force. Tonbridge, UK:Air Britain (Historians), 1980. .
 Jackson, Paul. "The Hastings...Last of a Transport Dynasty". Air Enthusiast, Forty, September–December 1989. Bromley, UK:Tri-Service Press. ISSN 0143-5450. pp. 1–7, 47–52.
 Lewis, Peter. Squadron Histories:R.F.C, R.N.A.S and R.A.F. 1912–59. London:Putnam, 1959.
 Mason, Francis K. The British Bomber since 1914. London:Putnam, 1994. .
 "Memorandum by the Secretary of State for Air". Flight, 11 March 1932. pp. 214–217.
 Rawlings, John D. R. Coastal, Support and Special Squadrons of the RAF and Their Aircraft. London: Jane's Publishing Company, 1982. .
 Richards, Denis and Hilary St. G. Saunders. Royal Air Force 1939–1945: Volume II: The Fight Avails. London: Her Majesty's Stationery Office, 1954.
 Shores, Christopher, Brian Cull and Yasuho Izawa. Bloody Shambles: Volume One: The Drift to War to the Fall of Singapore. London:Grub Street, 1992. .
 Shores, Christopher, Brian Cull and Yasuho Izawa. Bloody Shambles: Volume Two: The Defence of Sumatra to the Fall of Burma. London:Grub Street, 1993. .
 Shores, Christopher; Massimello, Giovanni; Guest, Russell; Olynyk, Frank; Bock, Winfried and Andy Thomas.  A History of the Mediterranean Air War 1940–1945: Volume Four: Sicily and Italy to the Fall of Rome: 14 May, 1943 – 5 June 1944. London: Grub Street, 2018. .
 Thetford, Owen. "By Day and By Night: Horsleys in Service". Aeroplane Monthly, November 1993, Vol 21 No 11 Issue 247. London:IPC. ISSN 0143-7240. pp. 32–40.
 Thetford, Owen. "By Day and By Night: Vildebeest in Service". Aeroplane Monthly, April 1995, Vol 23 No 4 Issue 264. London:IPC. ISSN 0143-7240. pp. 36–42.

External links

No 36 – 40 Squadron Histories. Air of Authority – A History of RAF Organisation.
Royal Air Force 36 Squadron Association

036 Squadron
036 Squadron
Military units and formations established in 1916
1916 establishments in the United Kingdom
Military units and formations in British Malaya in World War II